The weightlifting competition at the 1986 Central American and Caribbean Games was held in Santiago de los Caballeros, in June and July.

Medal summary

Men's events

Medal table
Ranking by Big (Total result) medals 

Ranking by all medals: Big (Total result) and Small (Snatch and Clean & Jerk)

References

 

Central American and Caribbean Games
1986